The Roman Catholic Diocese of Ajmer is a suffragan Latin diocese in the Ecclesiastical province of Agra in northwestern India, yet still depends on the missionary Roman Congregation for the Evangelization of Peoples.

Its cathedral episcopal see is Cathedral of the Immaculate Conception, in Ajmer, Rajasthan state.

Statistics 
As per 2014, it pastorally served 9,980 Catholics (0.0% of 22,073,000 total) on 146,690 km² in 10 parishes and 25 missions with 60 priests (40 diocesan, 20 religious), 479 lay religious (27 brothers, 452 sisters) and 18 seminarians.

History 
 Established in 1890 as Mission “sui iuris” of Rajputana, on colonial territory split off from its Metropolitan, the Archdiocese of Agra
 Promoted in 1891 as Apostolic Vicariate of Rajputana. At this date the district had only one mission station, Jaipur. Besides this, a Catholic priest resided at Ajmer in charge of a small community of Eurasians and Goans, and there were also stations for troops at Nasirabad, Neemuch, and Mhow, served by three military chaplains. After the arrival of French Capuchins, other stations were established at Ratlam, Thandla, Mariapur, Jhabua, Jhalrapatan, Parbatpura, and Bhawanikhera. The prefects were Father Bertram, 1892–1902, and Father Fortunatus, from 1903.
 22 May 1913: Promoted as Diocese of Ajmer
 Lost territory on 1935.03.11 to establish the Apostolic Prefecture of Indore
 Renamed on 13 May 1955 as Diocese of Ajmer–Jaipur
 Lost territories repeatedly : on 1963.09.13 to establish the Metropolitan Archdiocese of Bhopal, on 1973.04.03 to the Apostolic Exarchate of Sagar and on 1984.12.03 to establish the Diocese of Udaipur
 Renamed on 20 July 2005 as Diocese of Ajmer
Diocese of Ajmer-Jaipur comprised twenty four districts, namely Ajmer, Alwar, Baran, Barmer, Bikaner, Bundi, Churu, Dausa, Hanumangarh, Jaipur, Jaisalmer, Jalore, Jhalawar, Jhunjhunu, Jodhpur, Karauli, Kota, Nagaur, Pali, Sawai Madhopur, Sikar, Sirohi, Sri Ganganagar and Tonk in the state of Rajasthan. In July, 1890 the Holy See detached a very large portion of the Archdiocese of Agra to form a new unit, the Rajasthan mission entrusting it to the Capuchin Fathers of the Paris Province who were to work under the supervision of the Archbishop. In December, 1891, the new mission became the Prefecture Apostolic of Rajputana and in 1913, the then Prefect Rt. Rev. Fortunatus Henry Caumont O.F.M. Cap. was appointed the first bishop of Ajmer. On 11 March 1935, parts of the diocese which were in the state of Madhya Pradesh were detached to become part of the then newly erected Prefecture Apostolic of Indore.

Ordinaries 
(Latin Rite)

Ecclesiastical Superior?s of Rajputana
 no data available

Apostolic Vicar?s of Rajputana
 no data available

Suffragan Bishops of Ajmer
 Fortunat-Henri Caumont, Capuchin Franciscans (O.F.M. Cap.) (born France) (22 May 1913 – death 4 April 1930)
 Mathurin-Pie Le Ruyet, O.F.M. Cap. (born France) (8 June 1931 – retired 4 July 1938), emeritate as Titular Bishop of Alexandria minor (1938.07.04 – 1961.06.09)
 Guy-Léandre Le Floch, O.F.M. Cap. (born France) (13 June 1939 – death 9 August 1946)
 D’Mello (first born India) (21 April 1949 – 13 May 1955 see below)

Suffragan Bishop of Ajmer-Jaipur
 D’Mello (see above 13 May 1955 – retired 15 November 1978), died 1987

Suffragan Bishops of Ajmer
 Ignatius Menezes (born India) (15 November 1978 – retired 3 November 2012), later Apostolic Administrator of Diocese of Allahabad (India) (2013.01.31 – 2013.10.17)
Pius Thomas D'Souza (born India) (3 November 2012 – ... ), no previous prelature

Causes for canonisation
 Servant of God Fortunat-Henri Caumont, Capuchin Franciscans (O.F.M. Cap.), first prelate of the diocese of Ajmer

See also 
 List of Catholic dioceses in India

References

Sources and external links 
 GCatholic.org, with Google satellite photo - data for all sections 
 Catholic Hierarchy 
Attribution
  The entry cites:
Madras Catholic Directory, 1910;
FORTUNAT, Au Pays des Rajas (Paris, 1906).

Roman Catholic
Roman Catholic dioceses in India
Roman Catholic
Roman Catholic
Roman Catholic dioceses and prelatures established in the 19th century
Roman Catholic
Roman Catholic